Thenahandi Wijayapala Hector Mendis (16 December 1928 – 1 September 2012) was a Sri Lankan politician and a member of the Parliament of Sri Lanka.

Life and career

Mendis was born on 16 December 1928, third child of the former Mayor of Negombo, Mudliyar David Mendis and Magilin. He began his political career by joining United National Party Youth League of Negombo at age 19 and was elected the Mayor of Negombo in 1954.

He was married to Nanda de Silva for 59 years. They had three daughters and one son, Manouri, Davindra, Dilupa and Nadika.

In 1960 he entered Parliament from the Katana electorate as a United National Party candidate, and was re-elected in 1965 when he was promoted to Parliamentary Secretary to the Minister of Public Works, Post and Telecommunications. Except for a brief period after the defeat at the 1970 general election he represented the seat until 1989. After the landslide victory by the United National Party in the 1977 general election, he was appointed Minister of Textile Industries in 1977 and in 1989 he was Minister of Transport and Highways. In 1993 after the assassination of President Premadasa and Ranil Wickremesinghe became Prime Minister, he was appointed Leader of the House.

Mendis became the Chief Opposition Whip after the 1994 parliamentary election until 1998 when he joined the People's Alliance Government with the United National Party alternative group in opposition to the United National Party leadership. He lost his seat in 2001.

Wijayapala Mendis died on 1 September 2012, age 83.

References

External links 
 Appreciations
 Wijayapala Mendis passes away
 Mendis, Thenahndi Wijayapala Hector
 Political turmoil in Sri Lanka as UNP defectors back Kumaratunga
 WIJYAPALA MENDIS - 84th Birthday Remembrance
 Mendis, Thenahndi Wijayapala Hector

1928 births
2012 deaths
Mayors of Negombo
Members of the 4th Parliament of Ceylon
Members of the 5th Parliament of Ceylon
Members of the 6th Parliament of Ceylon
Members of the 7th Parliament of Ceylon
Members of the 8th Parliament of Sri Lanka
Members of the 9th Parliament of Sri Lanka
Members of the 10th Parliament of Sri Lanka
Members of the 11th Parliament of Sri Lanka
Parliamentary secretaries of Ceylon
People from Colombo
People from British Ceylon
Sinhalese politicians
Sri Lankan Buddhists
Transport ministers of Sri Lanka
United National Party politicians